is a town located in Tokachi Subprefecture, Hokkaido, Japan.

As of September 2016, the town has an estimated population of 7,441 and a density of 19 persons per km2. The total area is 391.99 km2.

Climate

Mascot

He is a soybean filled with dynamism and easiness. He is unveiled in 2001. His quote "Ii hito iimachi ikiikihonbetsu" (いいひと　いいまち　いきいきほんべつ) is a tongue twister.

References

External links

Official Website 

Towns in Hokkaido